Shirley Carter Burden Jr. (August 25, 1941 – January 23, 1996) was an American politician who served in the New York City Council from 1970 to 1977. He was a great-great-great grandson of Commodore Cornelius Vanderbilt.

Burden received his B.A. from Harvard University and his LL.B. from Columbia Law School.

He died on January 23, 1996, in Manhattan, New York City, at age 54.

References

1941 births
1996 deaths
New York City Council members
New York (state) Democrats
20th-century American politicians
Vanderbilt family
Harvard University alumni
Columbia Law School alumni